USS LST-345 was a  of the United States Navy during World War II.

History
LST-345 was laid down on 17 October 1942 at the Norfolk Navy Yard; launched on 15 December 1942; sponsored by Mrs. John B. Brown; and commissioned on 21 January 1943.

LST-345 departed US shores for northern Africa on 1 May 1943.

During World War II, LST-345 was assigned to the European theater and participated in the following operations:
 Sicilian occupation – July 1943
 Salerno landings – September 1943
 Invasion of Normandy – June 1944

While operating out of Bizerte, Tunisia, LST-345 was exposed to German air raids every night for three months. Sailing to Britain from the Mediterranean, LST-345 encountered a Nazi Wolf pack in the Atlantic. LST-345 made 56 cross-channel voyages between Britain and France in support of the Allied offensive in Europe.

Decommissioned on 5 December 1945 and struck from the Naval Register on 3 January 1946, she was sold on 23 March 1948 to the Ships & Power Equipment Co. of Barber, New Jersey for scrap.

LST-345 earned three battle stars for World War II service.

References
 
 
 George Henderson, Valley Patriot, Andover, North Andover

Ships built in Norfolk, Virginia
1942 ships
LST-0345
World War II amphibious warfare vessels of the United States